Rocky Mountain Bible Mission (RMBM) is an evangelical organization that provides leadership for rural churches in Montana and northern Idaho. It was founded by Darrel and Betty Burch in 1957, as an offshoot of the American Sunday School Union. The executive director is Peter Wetendorf.

According to Carlene Cross, RMBM teaches that the Bible represents "the exact words of God".

References

Christian organizations established in 1957
Evangelical organizations established in the 20th century
Christian organizations based in the United States